York Center may refer to:

Canada
 York Centre, Toronto, Ontario
 York Centre (provincial electoral district), Ontario

United States
 York Center, Illinois
 York Center, Ohio
 York Center, Wisconsin

See also
 North York City Centre, Toronto, Ontario, Canada